William Howland may refer to:

William Howland (musician) (1871–1945), American operatic bass, voice teacher, composer, conductor and university administrator
William Bailey Howland (1848–1917), American editor
William Goldwin Carrington Howland (1915–1994), Canadian lawyer, judge and former Chief Justice of Ontario
William Holmes Howland (1844–1893), Canadian politician
William Pearce Howland (1821–1907), Canadian politician